"By Your Side" is a song by contemporary Christian band Tenth Avenue North from their debut album Over and Underneath. It was released as the album's lead single in August 2008, and reached number 1 on R&R's Christian contemporary hit radio chart in January 2009.  In 2010, "By Your Side" won the 41st Annual GMA Dove Award for Song of the Year. In addition, the song also appeared on compilation albums WOW Hits 2010 and WOW #1s.

The song peaked at No. 2 on the Hot Christian Songs chart. It lasted 58 weeks on the overall chart, their longest charting single. The song is played in a G major key at 130 beats per minute.

Composition
The song is written from the perspective of Jesus Christ. Tenth Avenue North lead singer Mike Donehey's vocals have been compared to Jon Foreman. The lyrics talk of how Jesus promises to be with us through all the circumstances that we face in life. This song musically consists of a 3-note repetitive guitar pattern, simple piano, and gentle drums.

Awards

In 2010, the song won a Dove Award for Song of the Year at the 41st GMA Dove Awards.

Charts

Weekly charts

Year-end charts

Decade-end charts

Certifications

References

2008 singles
Songs written by Jason Ingram
Tenth Avenue North songs
Songs written by Phillip LaRue
2008 songs